HNLMS Snellius (A802) is a hydrographic survey vessel of the Royal Netherlands Navy. The Snellius has a sister ship, . Snellius is named after the mathematician Willebrord Snellius who contributed significantly to hydrography.

Construction and service
The ship was completed in the Netherlands from a Romanian-built hull. The ships have different tasks: surveying the sea, operating as guard ship, representing the Netherlands at home and abroad, assisting maritime scientific surveys by the Ministry of Defence and assisting rescue operations.

The current Snellius is the third hydrographic vessel with this name.

References

Snellius-class hydrographic survey vessels
Survey ships
Auxiliary ships of the Royal Netherlands Navy
2003 ships